Joe O’Boye (born 6 March 1960) is an Irish former professional snooker player. He represented the Republic of Ireland at the Snooker World Cup. He was the winner of the 1980 English Amateur Championship.

Career
O’Boye had three applications for professionalism declined by the WPBSA after his 1980 English Amateur Championship victory before they relented. In October 1985 he made his television debut at the 198
5 Rothmans Grand Prix held at the Hexagon in Reading against Jimmy White, losing 5-4 but with White winning the last 3 frames. Pre-game O’Boye was unable to find his dress suit and was still undressed four minutes before play with White offering to lend him his spare, before it was eventually found.

O’Boye reached the quarter-final at the 1987 International Open where he played Stephen Hendry following wins against Martin Clark, Kirk Stevens and Robby Foldvari. O’Boye defeated Danny Fowler and Barry West to reach the last 32 of the Snooker World Championship in 1989. He lost 10–6 to the seeded Silvino Francisco at The Crucible. O’Boye had previously reached the last 32 of the UK Championship in 1988, where he lost to former world champion Dennis Taylor.

O’Boye would often practise at a snooker club in Kings Cross along with the likes of Peter Ebdon and top 16 player Tony Drago. Drago beat O’Boye 9-0 in 81 minutes at the 1990 UK Championship. O’Boye was said to have been a significant influence in terms of his break-building abilities on the likes of Drago and Ebdon, as well as Jimmy White who was considered a drinking  buddy of O’Boye and their escapades together “tended to involve an inordinate amount of alcohol” although O’Boye was later said to have remarked “I don’t regret anything. You’re only young once, and you can’t buy youth.” O’Boye’s behaviour at the 1990 Rothmans Grand Prix in Reading in October 1990 caused him to be banned from the 1991 Mercantile Credit Classic. Further charges of abusive behaviour towards sponsors and match officials during the 1990 UK Championship in Preston and the Benson and Hedges satellite tournament in Glasgow caused further suspensions to include the 1991 World Snooker Championships.

References

Irish snooker players
Living people
1960 births
Sportspeople from Limerick (city)